Vail Mountain may refer to:

Vail Mountain (Colorado)
Vail Mountain (Missouri)